Lagrange, la Grange or La Grange (French: topographic name for someone who lived by a granary) is a French surname that may refer to
 La Grange (actor) (1635–1692), French actor
 Étienne de La Grange (died 1388), French politician
 Georges Lagrange (1928–2004), translator to and writer in Esperanto
 Georges Lagrange (bishop) (1929–2014), French Catholic bishop
 Henri Albert de La Grange d'Arquien (1613–1707), French nobility
 Henry-Louis de La Grange (1924–2017), French musicologist
 Joseph Lagrange (soldier) (1763–1836), French infantry general
 Joseph-Louis Lagrange (1736–1813), mathematician and astronomer
 Ken La Grange (1923–2001), South African boxer
 Kyla La Grange (born 1986), English singer and songwriter
 Léo Lagrange (1900–1940), French minister
 Louis André Lagrange (1804–1861), French naval commissioner, twice acting governor of Martinique
 Magdelaine de La Grange (1641–1679), French fortune-teller involved in the Affair of the Poisons
 Marcus la Grange (born 1977), South African sprinter
 Marie-Joseph Lagrange (1855–1938), Catholic priest in the Dominican Order
 Nicolas La Grange (1707–1767), French playwright and translator 
 Oscar Hugh La Grange (1837–1915), Union Army colonel in the American Civil War
 Pierre Lagrange (born 1962), Belgian hedge fund manager
 Reginald Garrigou-Lagrange (1877–1964), Dominican Thomist theologian and philosopher
 René de Béthoulat de La Grange-Fromenteau, governor of Saint-Christophe, 1638-39
 Zelda La Grange (born 1970), secretary to the South African President Nelson Mandela

See also
Le Grange (disambiguation)
Grange (surname)

French-language surnames
French toponymic surnames